Muhammed Akbar Khan, Crown Prince of Afghanistan (4 August 1933 – 26 November 1942) was the first son of Mohammed Zahir Shah, the former King of Afghanistan, and the heir apparent to the throne of Afghanistan during his lifetime.

Ancestry

References 

Muhammad Akbar Khan, Crown Prince of Afghanistan
Muhammad Akbar Khan, Crown Prince of Afghanistan
Afghan princes
Heirs apparent who never acceded
Pashtun people
Sons of kings
Royalty who died as children